Steven F. Hayward (born October 16, 1958) is an American conservative author, political commentator, and policy scholar. He is a senior resident scholar at the Institute of Governmental Studies at the University of California, Berkeley, and a visiting lecturer at Boalt Hall. He was previously the Ronald Reagan Distinguished Visiting Professor at Pepperdine University's Graduate School of Public Policy, and was the inaugural visiting scholar in conservative thought and policy at the University of Colorado at Boulder. From 2002 to 2012 he was the F.K Weyerhaeuser Fellow in Law and Economics at the American Enterprise Institute in Washington, D.C., and has been senior fellow at the Pacific Research Institute in San Francisco since 1991.

Early life and education 
Hayward was born in 1958.  In 1980, he earned a Bachelor of Science in business from Lewis and Clark College. In 1984, he earned a Masters of Arts in government and a Doctor of Philosophy in American Studies in 1996 from the Claremont Graduate School.

Career
In 1984, Hayward started work as director of journalism of the group Public Research Syndicated at the Claremont Institute through 1987. In 1985, he also became Executive Director for Inland Business Magazine through 1990.  In 1987, he became director of the Golden State Center for Policy Studies through 1991.

In 1990, Hayward became contributing editor for Reason through 2001 and also became a Public Interest Member in the California Citizens Compensation Commission through 1995. In 1996, he served on the Departmental Transportation Advisory Committee of the government of the State of California through 2001.

During the 2004 U.S. Presidential elections, he served on the George W. Bush for President campaign.

In 2008, he served a one-year term as president of the Philadelphia Society.

Hayward has testified before the Committee on Energy and Commerce at the United States House on two occasions.

Hayward has served as visiting fellow professor, scholar, or lecturer at the following institutions:
 Intercollegiate Studies Institute – Weaver Fellow (1985–86)
 Ashland University – Distinguished Fellow at John M. Ashbrook Center
 Mont Pelerin Society – Olive Garvey Fellow (1990, 1992)
 Pacific Research Institute for Public Policy – senior fellow (1991–Present)
 Heritage Foundation – Fellow (1993–1994, 1997–1998)
 American Enterprise Institute – Fellow (2002–2012?)
 Georgetown University – visiting lecturer in the Government Department (2003–Present)
 The Fund for American Studies –  inaugural visiting scholar (2013–2014)
 University of Colorado Boulder – First Visiting Scholar in Conservative Thought and Policy (2013–2014)
 Pepperdine University as Visiting Ronald Reagan Professor of Public Policy (2014–2014)
 University of California, Berkeley – senior resident scholar at the Institute of Governmental Studies and visiting lecturer at Boalt Hall

Hayward is treasurer of the Donors Capital Fund, a donor-advised fund, and a member of its board of directors.

In January 2011, Hayward began writing for the political/general-interest blog Power Line.

In 2012, Hayward published The Politically Incorrect Guide to the Presidents: From Wilson to Obama. That same year, he co-authored an article with Kenneth P. Green entitled, 'Market-Friendly Energy', in The 4% Solution: Unleashing the Economic Growth America Needs, published by the George W. Bush Presidential Center.

For more than a decade, he has directed the Ashbrook Center's new program in political economy at Ashland University.

He often hosts for William Bennett's radio show Morning in America on the broadcasting network of Salem Media Group.

Personal life
Hayward is married to former George Mason University Law School professor Allison Hayward. In March 2011, he joked that he won't argue "about campaign finance reform.... That's what I have a spouse for."

Hayward is a climate change denier and, as such, is a member of the "Cornwall Alliance for the Stewardship of Creation," which describes itself as a "network of about 60 Christian theologians, natural scientists, economists, and other scholars educating for Biblical earth stewardship, economic development for the poor, and the proclamation and defense of the good news of salvation by God's grace, received through faith in Jesus Christ's death and resurrection."

Hayward was described as "big-boned" by an article in The New York Times, after which he lost about 45 lb by dieting. He stated that he gave up eating like Fred Flintstone in order to "eat like Bruce Jenner" (now Caitlyn Jenner). He also began lifting weights.

Hayward has written online about his interest in Monster Truck sports and about attending the rallies.

Hayward is or has been a member of the:
 Philadelphia Society
 National Tax Limitation Committee
 Interfaith Stewardship Alliance
 Center of the American Experiment
 Donors Trust

Views

Environment and global warming
Hayward generally believes that the Earth's environment is far more resilient than public opinion would think. He has said, "we talk as though the earth is so fragile that, you know, we're endlessly insulting it in its doom." He has also said, "environmental concern rightly understood as now a settled middle class value in wealthy countries and will become more so in other countries around the world as they prosper and that's a key point." He supports the idea of an environmental Kuznets curve, in which increased economic development constitutes the best way to help the environment. He believes that modern developing nations such as China could speed through the curve with technological progress.

Hayward rejects claims that climate change poses a major threat to humanity, and mocks climate scientists analysts fearful of change  as "climateers," "climatistas," "alarmists," and the "environmental Politburo." He thinks that recent global warming is partially due to human activities, but not entirely. He has advocated that the world engage in geoengineering projects to mitigate global warming, such as spraying saltwater in the air to increase cloud cover over the oceans and thus reflect back sunlight. He advocates that the U.S. build more nuclear power plants as another necessary solution.  Generally, he views current global warming advocates as similar to Paul Ehrlich and other past advocates of a 'population bomb' thesis. He believes that both issues represented a serious problem that was blown completely out of proportion by inaccurate estimates about the future. He has remarked, "the environment is too important to be left to the environmentalists." He has mocked the Green New Deal as the "Green Nude Eel" and claimed that "enlarging government power to 'fight climate change' is nowadays a central purpose of the left."

He created and starred in the documentary An Inconvenient Truth...Or Convenient Fiction?, a rebuttal of many of the claims in Al Gore's An Inconvenient Truth, saying that while Gore is right about many things, he goes too far in predictions of doom. In 1994, he has co-authored an annual Index of Leading Environmental Indicators (1996–2008), published by the Pacific Research Institute, issued each Earth Day.

Ronald Reagan
In his books about Reagan, Hayward argued that Reagan had the important insight that the Soviet Union was internally weak due to socio-economic problems, which distinguishes Reagan from most intellectual conservatives in recent American history. He stated that Reagan's foreign policy and domestic policy should be thought of as two sides of the same coherent worldview. He has referred to Reagan as, on net, more of a tax cutter despite having enacted both tax increases and decreases because the marginal tax brackets shrunk.  He praised Reagan for trying to reduce the size of the federal government, cutting certain social welfare programs, moving other programs to state control, expanding the U.S. military, advocating Constitutional originalism, and making disarmament pledges with the Soviet Union. He criticized Reagan for his conduct in the Iran-Contra affair, concluding that Reagan let his emotions take over his judgment and wrongly paid for hostages via arms. He also criticized Reagan for declining to push for a Taxpayer Bill of Rights until the latter part of his second term. Hayward estimated that Reagan ultimately failed to create a true Constitution-based ideological movement to succeed him. He also described current conservative views of Reagan as too superficial and focused too much on style.

Writings
Articles written by Hayward appeared in The Weekly Standard starting in 2001 and in National Review-related publications since 2002. He has also published writings in The New York Times, The Wall Street Journal, Policy Review, Chicago Tribune, Los Angeles Daily News, County Reporter, The San Diego Union-Tribune, San Francisco Chronicle, The Sacramento Bee, The Washington Times, The Columbus Dispatch, The Plain Dealer (Cleveland, Ohio), and The Kansas City Star.

He is the author of a two-volume biography of Ronald Reagan (The Age of Reagan, 1964–1980: The Fall of the Old Liberal Order in 2001 and The Age of Reagan: The Conservative Counterrevolution: 1980–1989 in 2009), which received favorable reviews.
 Churchill on Leadership: Executive Success in the Face of Adversity (Prima, 1997) (Crown Forum, 1998)
 The Age of Reagan: The Fall of the Old Liberal Order, 1964–1980 (Prima Publishing, Forum, 2001)
 The Real Jimmy Carter: How Our Worst Ex-President Undermines American Foreign Policy, Coddles Dictators and Created the Party of Clinton and Kerry (Regnery Publishing, 2004)
 Greatness: Reagan, Churchill, and the Making of Extraordinary Leaders (Crown Forum, 2005)
 The Age of Reagan: The Conservative Counterrevolution: 1980–1989 (Crown Forum, 2010)
 Mere Environmentalism: A Biblical Perspective on Humans and the Natural World (Values and Capitalism) (AEI Press, 2010)
 The Politically Incorrect Guide to the Presidents: From Wilson to Obama (Politically Incorrect Guides) (Regnery Publishing, 2012)
 Patriotism Is Not Enough: Harry Jaffa, Walter Berns, and the Arguments that Redefined American Conservatism (Encounter Books, 2017)

See also

 List of American Enterprise Institute scholars and fellows
 An Inconvenient Truth...Or Convenient Fiction?

Notes

References

External links
 Steven F. Hayward at Powerline
 

1958 births
Living people
21st-century American male writers
21st-century American non-fiction writers
American columnists
American economics writers
American Enterprise Institute
American male bloggers
American bloggers
American male non-fiction writers
American political commentators
American political writers
Claremont Graduate University alumni
Lewis & Clark College alumni
Non-fiction environmental writers
The Weekly Standard people